James Manning (1814–1893) was an English born architect and builder, active in Perth Western Australia. He trained as a civil engineer, and worked in London, sailing to Perth in 1850 to assume the position of the Clerk of Works in the Comptroller-General's office in Western Australia.  In this role he played an active part in the construction of a number of key colonial buildings.

Manning was known to have signed the plans for the following projects:  
 Convict Depot (1856, 1859) at Mount Eliza
 Commissariat Stores (1856) 
 Geraldton Courthouse (1866)
 Toodyay gaol (1868)
 Northampton Police Station (1867)
 William Police Station (1867)
 Kojanup Police Station (1868)
 Lower Blackwood Police Station (1868)
 Government House (Stage 2), Rottnest
 Wooden jetty, Albany
 Wooden jetty, Vasse
 Wooden jetty, Bunbury
 Wooden jetty, Fremantle
 Wooden jetty, Champion Bay
 Fremantle Traffic Bridge (1864–66)

Perth Town Hall 

Manning is often attributed as being one of the designers of the Perth Town Hall (1867–179), although his contribution is more likely to have been in supervising the construction. Ray and John Oldham argued that Richard Roach Jewell was more likely to have been responsible for the design. He is thought to be responsible for the design of the Jarrah hammerbeam ceiling.

References

External links
 

1814 births
1893 deaths
English architects
Architects from Western Australia
People from Perth, Western Australia
People from Fremantle